The Environmental Planning and Assessment Act 1979 was passed in the Australian state of New South Wales.

It is an "Act to institute a system of environmental planning and assessment for the State of New South Wales".

The act incorporated a three-tiered system of state, regional (now repealed) and local levels of significance, and required the relevant planning authority to take into consideration the impacts to the environment (both natural and built) and the community of proposed development or land-use change. Most development requires a Statement of Environmental Effects detailing the impacts to both natural and human environments, which should be taken into consideration by the regulatory authority, while larger projects require a more thorough environmental impact assessment and greater public scrutiny.

Parts of the Act

The Act covers the entire spectrum of environmental assessment and was divided into 11 Parts.
 PART 1  - PRELIMINARY
 PART 2  - ADMINISTRATION
 PART 2A - PLANNING BODIES
 PART 3  - ENVIRONMENTAL PLANNING INSTRUMENTS
 PART 3A - (REPEALED) 
 PART 3B - STRATEGIC PLANNING 
 PART 4  - DEVELOPMENT ASSESSMENT
 PART 4A - CERTIFICATION OF DEVELOPMENT
 PART 4B - (REPEALED)
 PART 4C - LIABILITY AND INSURANCE
 PART 5  - ENVIRONMENTAL ASSESSMENT
 PART 5A - (REPEALED)
 PART 6  - IMPLEMENTATION AND ENFORCEMENT
 PART 7  - FINANCE
 PART 7A - LIABILITY IN RESPECT OF CONTAMINATED LAND
 PART 8  - MISCELLANEOUS
It was amended in 2017 by the Environmental Planning and Assessment Amendment Act 2017 (commencing on 1 March 2018), and is now divided into 10 Parts.

 PART 1 - PRELIMINARY
 PART 2 - PLANNING ADMINISTRATION
 PART 3 - PLANNING INSTRUMENTS
 PART 4 - DEVELOPMENT ASSESSMENT AND CONSENT
 PART 5 - INFRASTRUCTURE AND ENVIRONMENTAL IMPACT ASSESSMENT
 PART 6 - BUILDING AND SUBDIVISION CERTIFICATION
 PART 7 - INFRASTRUCTURE CONTRIBUTIONS AND FINANCE
 PART 8 - REVIEWS AND APPEALS
 PART 9 - IMPLEMENTATION AND ENFORCEMENT
 PART 10 – MISCELLANEOUS

Controversy over Part 3a
The Act gained considerable controversy with the introduction of section part 3a that effectively allowed the Planning Minister to declare a project as of  “State significance” and assume direct approval delegation. Although it was introduced to streamline the planning process and fast track the assessment of large infrastructure projects, a public perception of its misuse was a significant factor in the defeat of the Keneally government.

See also
Environment of Australia
 Environmental planning

References

External links
Text of the Act

Environment of New South Wales
Environmental law in Australia
1979 in Australian law
1979 in the environment
New South Wales legislation
1970s in New South Wales